Between 1993 and 2020 professional darts had two rival bodies which staged tournaments and had separate pools of players, the British Darts Organisation (BDO) and the Professional Darts Corporation (PDC). Both staged its own world championship. In practice, players had to choose which organisation to represent, but many switched between the two, which often caused controversy. 

This situation arose following an acrimonious split in the early 1990s between the leading players and the BDO. Darts had boomed in popularity during the 1980s, with as many as 23 televised events in 1983. However, by the end of the decade this had fallen to just one. This, combined with general disillusionment at the BDO's management of the sport, prompted 16 top players to break away and form their own body. Four years of legal action followed, culminating in the 1997 Tomlin order, which confirmed the existence of both bodies, and established that players were free choose which one to play for.

This list documents the players who made the decision to switch from one organisation to the other. In general more players switched from the BDO to the PDC than vice versa, attracted by the greater prize money and better competition offered by the PDC. The BDO folded in 2020, but many of their events were subsequently revived by the World Darts Federation, so the split in darts remains.

World Darts Council foundation
The sixteen darts defectors who formed the WDC were as follows:

Since then, many darts players have left the BDO to join the PDC, although some players rejoined the BDO either from finding it difficult on the PDC circuit or lack of sponsorship. The PDC had new talent of their own. However some players left them to join the BDO.

Players who transferred from the BDO to the PDC

BDO darts players who joined the PDC before returning

PDC darts players who joined the BDO before returning

References

Transferred between the BDO and PDC